Michael Morton (1864 – 11 January 1931) was an English dramatist in the early 20th century.

Career

Detective Sparkes

Morton's comedy called Detective Sparkes opened at the Garrick Theatre in August 1909 to good reviews. He also directed the production which ran into October for a total of 64 performances.

The Yellow Ticket
In 1914, Morton's play, The Yellow Ticket ran 183 performances on Broadway and starred Florence Reed and John Barrymore. It was adapted to the screen and, due to its popularity, several filmed versions were made in the silent era alone. The first, The Yellow Passport (1916), was directed by Edwin August and starred Clara Kimball Young. The second version, The Yellow Ticket (1918), starred Fannie Ward, Warner Oland and Milton Sills. A German version called Der Gelbe Schein  was produced in 1918 and starred Pola Negri. Yet another filmed version was a talking picture and was directed by Raoul Walsh in 1931. It was also titled The Yellow Ticket; its players were Elissa Landi, Lionel Barrymore and Laurence Olivier. James Wong Howe was the cameraman.

Colonel Newcome

Morton adapted William Makepeace Thackeray's 1854-55 novel The Newcomes into a play called Colonel Newcome, which opened in April 1917 at the New Amsterdam Theatre and starred Herbert Tree and St. Clair Bayfield.

Woman to Woman
His 1921 play Woman to Woman was adapted three times for film.

Alibi
He adapted Agatha Christie's novel The Murder of Roger Ackroyd into a play called Alibi, which opened in London in 1928. This was her first work adapted to the stage and it ran 250 performances.

Notes

External links
 
 
Michael Morton on Great War Theatre

English dramatists and playwrights
1864 births
1931 deaths
English male dramatists and playwrights